Ismahil Akinade (born 11 February 1994) is a Nigerian-born professional footballer who plays as a forward for Malaysia Super League club Kelantan.

Career

Bray Wanderers
Akinade started his career at St Patrick's Athletic Under 19's (making the bench for the first team once as an unused substitute) before moving on to Bray Wanderers where he was a huge hit with fans and won the club's Young Player of the Year award for the 2013 season. Akinade parted ways with Bray at the end of the 2014 season after he played a huge part in guaranteeing the Seagulls safety in the Premier Division.

Bohemians
Midway through the 2015 League of Ireland season, Akinade signed for Bohemians, making his debut in a 2–1 win away to Dundalk on 6 June, setting up the first goal. Akinade was nominated for Young Player Of The Year after scoring 10 goals in 18 matches in his first season with the club. In October 2015, he agreed to a new contract. Akinade went on to score 5 goals in 18 appearances for the 2016 season and in the 2017 season injury ruled him out for the first half of the season, when he returned he scored memorable goals against fierce rivals Shamrock Rovers in a 2–1 win in Tallaght and the winner against Dundalk in Oriel Park.

Waterford
Akinade left Bohs to sign for Waterford for the 2018 League of Ireland Premier Division season. Akinade made his debut in a 2–1 win against Derry City on 17 February 2018. He departed from the club by mutual agreement on 24 June 2019.

Hồ Chí Minh City
On 28 June 2019, V.League 1 side Hồ Chí Minh City announced the signing of Akinade. He made a scoring debut for the club that same day in a game against Viettel FC in the Vietnamese National Football Cup. He left at the end of the season following 5 goals in 11 games, with the club looking to replace him with former Liverpool striker David N'Gog.

CLB SHB Đà Nẵng
In November 2019, Akinade signed a one-year contract with CLB SHB Đà Nẵng, also of the V.League 1.

 Sexual abuse of a 14-year-old girl 
It was reported in October 2014 that Akinade and two other people had received suspended sentences for the 2010 sexual abuse of a 14-year-old girl in Kildare.

Personal life
He is the cousin of Fuad Sule, who is also a professional footballer.

In 2017, Akinade was absent for half the season due to an illness, in February 2017 he had his spleen removed and returned in June 2018.

In April 2017, Akinade was issued a deportation order. His application to have the deportation stopped was rejected in the High Court in May 2019. He returned to Nigeria voluntarily in June.

Career statistics

HonoursBohemians'
Lenister Senior Cup: 2015–16

References

External links
 

Living people
1994 births
Sportspeople from Ibadan
Association football forwards
Nigerian footballers
Leinster Senior League (association football) players
League of Ireland players
V.League 1 players
Bangladesh Premier League players
Bray Wanderers F.C. players
Bohemian F.C. players
Waterford F.C. players
Ho Chi Minh City FC players
SHB Da Nang FC players
Sheikh Russel KC players
Kelantan F.C. players
Nigerian expatriate footballers
Nigerian expatriate sportspeople in Ireland
Expatriate association footballers in the Republic of Ireland
Nigerian expatriate sportspeople in Bangladesh
Expatriate footballers in Bangladesh
People convicted of child sexual abuse